Center Township is one of twelve townships in Hendricks County, Indiana, United States. As of the 2010 census, its population was 12,167.

History
Center Township was so named from its position near the geographical center of Hendricks County.

Geography
The stream of Thompson Creek runs through this township.

Cities and towns
 Danville (the county seat)

Unincorporated towns
 Gale
 Nash
(This list is based on USGS data and may include former settlements.)

Adjacent townships
 Union Township (north)
 Middle Township (northeast)
 Washington Township (east)
 Liberty Township (south)
 Clay Township (southwest)
 Marion Township (west)
 Eel River Township (northwest)

Cemeteries
The township contains twenty-one cemeteries: Arnold, Arnold-Stuart, Ayears, Christie East, Christie West, Cofer, Danville East, Danville South, Gentry, Hardwick, Hillside, Hyten, Kiger, Mill Creek, Mount Pleasant, New Mill Creek (historical), Nichols, Noland Number 2, Primitive Baptist, Saint Augustine Memorial Gardens and Templin.

Major highways
  U.S. Route 36
  Indiana State Road 39
  Indiana State Road 236

Airports and landing strips
 Hendricks County Airport
 Meadors Field Airport II82
 JR's Airport 11IN
 Temple Airport

Education
Center Township residents may obtain a free library card from the Danville-Center Township Public Library in Danville.

References
 
 United States Census Bureau cartographic boundary files

External links

Townships in Hendricks County, Indiana
Townships in Indiana